Music Perception: An Interdisciplinary Journal is a peer-reviewed academic journal published by University of California Press five times a year. It was founded by Diana Deutsch.

According to the Journal Citation Reports, the journal has a 2018 impact factor of 1.152.

Succession of editors
Diana Deutsch, Founding Editor
Jamshed Bharucha
Robert Gjerdingen
Lola Cuddy
Catherine (Kate) J. Stevens

References

External links
  Music Perception on University of California Press Journals website

Music journals
University of California Press academic journals
English-language journals
Publications established in 1983
5 times per year journals